Jenny Hill (born 20 November 1972) is an Australian judoka. She competed in the women's half-middleweight event at the 2000 Summer Olympics.

References

External links
 

1972 births
Living people
Australian female judoka
Olympic judoka of Australia
Judoka at the 2000 Summer Olympics
Sportspeople from Canberra